Dunsfort is a civil parish in County Down, Northern Ireland. It is situated in the historic barony of Lecale Lower. It is also a townland of 384 acres.

Settlements
The civil parish contains the following settlements:
Ballyhornan

Townlands
Dunsfort civil parish contains the following townlands:

Ballybeg
Ballyedock Lower
Ballyedock Upper
Ballyhornan
Ballymenagh
Bishops Court
Corbally
Dunsfort
Guns Island
Lismore
Ringawaddy
Sheepland Beg
Sheepland More
Tollumgrange Lower
Tollumgrange Upper
Tullynaskeagh

See also
List of civil parishes of County Down

References

 
Townlands of County Down